Hume most commonly refers to:
 David Hume (1711–1776), Scottish philosopher

Hume may also refer to:

People 

 Hume (surname)
 Hume (given name)
 James Hume Nisbet (1849–1923), Scottish-born novelist and artist

In fiction 
 Hume, the name of the human race in the Invalice universe of the computer game series Final Fantasy
 Desmond Hume, a fictional character on the television series Lost
 Eleanor Hume, a character from the role-playing video game Tales of Berseria
 Nick Hume, the protagonist of the 2007 film Death Sentence
 Hobart Hume III, a fictional character on the television series Shining Time Station

Places

Australia
 Hume, Australian Capital Territory, a suburb of Canberra
 City of Hume, a municipality in northern Melbourne
 Hume County, a cadastral division of New South Wales
 Division of Hume, an electoral district in the Australian House of Representatives, in New South Wales
 Hume (region), a region in northeastern Victoria
 Hume Highway, the main road between Melbourne and Sydney
 Lake Hume, a large artificial lake and the associated Hume Dam

Scotland
 Hume Castle, the historic 13th-century eponymous fortress of the Hume/Home family in Berwickshire
 Hume, Scottish Borders, a village

United States
 Hume, Fresno County, California, an unincorporated community
 Hume Lake, in Fresno County, California
 Hume, Illinois, a village
 Hume, Missouri, a city
 Hume, New York, a town
 Hume, Ohio, an unincorporated community
 Hume, Virginia, an unincorporated community
 Hume Township, Whiteside County, Illinois
 Hume Township, Michigan

Moon
 Hume (crater)

Other uses 
 Hume (soil), a type of soil
 Hume (programming language) (Higher-order Unified Meta-Environment), a computer programming language
 Hume Bank, an Australian banking co-op
 Lord Hume of Berwick, a title which was created twice, in the Peerages of England and Great Britain
 Hume baronets, two titles, one in the Baronetage of Nova Scotia and the other in the Baronetage of Great Britain
 Hume Formation, a geologic formation in the Northwest Territories, Canada
 Hume Lake Christian Camps, a nonprofit parachurch operator of Christian camps and conference centers
 Hume Street, Dublin, Ireland
 Hume School, Arlington County, Virginia, United States, on the National Register of Historic Places

See also 
 Hulme (disambiguation)